Thomas T. Poleman III (born October 26, 1964) is the Chief Programming Officer and President of National Programming for iHeartMedia, the leading audio company in the U.S., and oversees the programming and music strategy, talent development, and artist relations for iHeartMedia’s radio stations. He also heads iHeartMedia's music discovery and emerging artist initiatives, including the Artist Integration Program and the On the Verge program, which has played a key role in breaking artists like Doja Cat, Luke Combs, Olivia Rodrigo, Post Malone, Maren Morris, H.E.R., and Sam Smith early in their careers. In addition, Poleman co-produces iHeartMedia’s major national marque events including the iHeartRadio Music Festival, the iHeartRadio Music Awards, the nationwide Z100 Jingle Ball Tour, the iHeartCountry Festival, iHeartRadio ALTer Ego, iHeartRadio Fiesta Latina, and iHeartPodcast Awards.

At an early age, Poleman had a keen ear for music. Studying piano and guitar he fell in love with rock ‘n’ roll, and not surprisingly the radio, the subject he studied at Cornell. Poleman started as a DJ at Cornell University's commercial, student-owned radio station WVBR-FM in Ithaca and served as its program director during his senior year, before graduating in 1986. This experience was his gateway into the industry pivoting him through his journey of an impactful career. Landing jobs at WKCI-FM and WAVZ New Haven, and WALK Long Island, and KRBE Houston, and being named the youngest corporate programming executive for AM/FM Broadcasting in 1999 ultimately led him back home to New York with his most challenging obstacle yet. The turning point of his career was when he tackled the daunting task of remaking the then-struggling Z100 at the age of 31. That year, he named Elvis Duran to mornings, shifted the station back to its Top 40 roots, and established Z100’s Jingle Ball at Madison Square Garden, which has since become a nationwide tour. Tom Poleman is credited with bringing Z100 from #18 in the market to the top 5, doubling its ratings in two years, and making it the most listened-to top-40 station in the United States. With his guidance, he also brought all five New York City iHeartMedia stations (WHTZ, WLTW, WKTU, Q104.3, Power 105.1) into the top 15 where his work led him to be named Senior Vice President of Programming for iHeartMedia (formerly Clear Channel). Moving mountains within this industry, and creating record toping strategies led him to be promoted in 2017 as the Chief Programming Officer at iHeartMedia and appointed to President of National Programming Platforms. 

With power comes a great level of responsibility. Poleman is deeply committed to community service. He currently serves on the board and also volunteers for Musicians on Call. He was honored in 2004 by LIFEbeat - The Music Industry Fights AIDS, 1999 by the T.J Martell Foundation, and also in 1999, as the recipient of the Gloria Swanson Humanitarian Award by the American Cinema Awards. At the prime of the COVID-19 pandemic, iHeartMedia knowing that they directly interact with 245 million people per month recognized its duty to help, with Poleman guiding on the frontlines. Identifying the need for community, Polemen and partner in crime John Sykes quickly assembled benefits like Feeding America and First Responders Children’s foundations, where they gathered performances by artists including; Alicia Keys, Sam Smith, Backstreet Boys, Green Day’s Billie Joe Armstrong, and Tim McGraw for this significant cause. 

Poleman has received numerous accolades throughout his career, including being honored numerous times as Major Market Mainstream Top 40 Program Director of the Year at the Radio Music Awards and named to Billboard’s Power 100 List in 2012 through 2018. Creating a new breed and standard for future programmers, Poleman’s work will be remembered for the integration of accessibility, accountability, and shared goals between the record label and radio relationship. A relationship that was once seen as transactional and unspoken enemies, to now a system that helps break artists and bring great records to a broader and bigger audience.

Personal life
Tom Poleman was previously married to Virginia Marie McAleer. Together, they have a son, Michael Thomas Poleman, and a daughter, Julia Kelly Poleman.

References

IHeartMedia
American media executives
Cornell University alumni
Living people
1964 births